The Stafford Smythe Memorial Trophy is a Canadian Hockey League (CHL) trophy, awarded to the most valuable player in the annual Memorial Cup Tournament. The trophy was first awarded in 1972 and won by Richard Brodeur of the QMJHL's Cornwall Royals. Taylor Hall won the award in 2009 and 2010 with the Windsor Spitfires making him the first repeat winner in the trophy's history.  Through the 2011 season, it has been won 17 times by players on a team representing the Western Hockey League, 13 by those from the OHL and 9 by players from the QMJHL.

The Kamloops Blazers franchise has had the most MVPs at six: three as members of the Blazers, and three when the franchise was known as the New Westminster Bruins. The Cornwall Royals had three MVPs. Eight players have won the Smythe Trophy despite their team failing to win the Memorial Cup: Sam Steel (2018), Leon Draisaitl (2015), Danny Groulx (2002), Chris Madden (1998), Cameron Mann (1996), Sean McKenna (1982), Bart Hunter (1979) and Barry Smith (1975).

The trophy is named in honour of Stafford Smythe, the son of Conn Smythe. Stafford was part of a group that purchased controlling interest in the National Hockey League's (NHL) Toronto Maple Leafs in 1961, and served as the president of the Toronto franchise and Maple Leaf Gardens for many years.  The Smythe family donated the trophy to the CHL in 1972, shortly after his death.

Winners

See also
List of Canadian Hockey League awards

References

External links
 History – Awards – Mastercard Memorial Cup

Canadian Amateur Hockey Association trophies
Canadian Hockey League trophies and awards